The Jacksonville metropolitan statistical area, as defined by the United States Census Bureau, is an area consisting of one county – Onslow – in North Carolina, anchored by the city of Jacksonville. As of the 2020 census, the MSA had a population of 204,576.

Counties
Onslow

Communities
Half Moon (census-designated place)
Town of Holly Ridge
City of Jacksonville (principal city)
City of North Topsail Beach
Piney Green (census-designated place)
Petersburg (unincorporated)
Pumpkin Center (census-designated place)
Town of Richlands
Sneads Ferry (census-designated place)
Town of Surf City (partial)
Town of Swansboro

See also
North Carolina census statistical areas

References

Metropolitan areas of North Carolina